The 2007 Peterborough City Council election took place on 3 May 2007 to elect members of Peterborough City Council in England. This was on the same day as other local elections.

Election result

References

2007
2000s in Cambridgeshire
Peterborough